"A Day Late, a Dollar Short" is a song by the Finnish rock band Hanoi Rocks from their comeback album Twelve Shots on the Rocks. It was written by the band's guitarist Andy McCoy.

The song became one of the most successful and popular song of the reborn Hanoi Rocks.

The music video featured the band playing the song at a concert, while singer Michael Monroe tries to get there.

Track listing

Personnel 
Michael Monroe – lead vocals, saxophone
Andy McCoy – lead guitar
Costello Hautamäki – rhythm guitar
Timpa Laine – bass
Lacu – drums

Hanoi Rocks songs
2003 songs
Songs written by Andy McCoy